Trojden II of Płock (1403/06 - 25 July 1427), was a Polish prince member of the House of Piast from the Masovian branch. He was a Duke of Płock, Rawa Mazowiecka, Gostynin, Sochaczew and Belz during 1426-1427 jointly with his brothers.

He was the fourth son of Siemowit IV, Duke of Masovia and Alexandra of Lithuania, daughter of Algirdas.

Life
On 5 March 1424 along with his brothers Siemowit V, Casimir II and Władysław I, Trojden II attended the wedding and coronation of King Władysław II Jagiełło's third wife, Sophia of Halshany.

After the death of their father on 21 January 1426 Trojden II and his brothers, not wanting to further weakened their positions and domains with subsequents divisions, decided to co-rule all their paternal inheritance. Another factor could be the difficult relationship with their mother, and after an eventual division of their domains they are forced to give her part of the lands as her dower. Despite the nominal co-rulership of the brothers, they administered separately their parts of the duchy. An analysis of the documents issued by Trojden II showed that he received Płock. On 8 September 1426 he and his brothers Siemowit V and Władysław I paid homage to the Polish King at Sandomierz.

Trojden II died on 25 July 1427, unmarried and without issue. He was probably buried at Płock Cathedral.

Notes

References
O. Balzer: Genealogia Piastów, Kraków 1895, pp. 506–507.
K. Jasiński: Rodowód Piastów mazowieckich, Poznań – Wrocław 1998, pp. 130–132.
M. Wilamowski: Siemowit V, [in:] K. Ożóg, S. Szczur (ed.), Piastowie. Leksykon biograficzny, Kraków 1999, p. 310.
M. Wilamowski: Trojden II, [in:] K. Ożóg, S. Szczur (ed.), Piastowie. Leksykon biograficzny, Kraków 1999, p. 318.

Dukes of Masovia
1400s births
1427 deaths